Honor the Earth is a non-profit organization founded to raise awareness and financial support for Indigenous environmental justice. The organization was founded by Indigo Girls Amy Ray and Emily Saliers after meeting Winona LaDuke, and after consultation with members of the Indigenous Environmental Network, Indigenous Women's Network and Seventh Generation Fund. Since 2016, Winona LaDuke and other members of Honor the Earth have been active in the Dakota Access Pipeline protests.

Honor the Earth's mission is to create awareness and support for Native environmental issues and to develop needed financial and political resources for the survival of sustainable Native communities. Honor the Earth develops these resources by using music, the arts, the media, and Indigenous wisdom to ask people to recognize our joint dependency on the Earth and be a voice for those not heard.

Goals and priorities
The campaign priorities of Honor the Earth are:
energy justice/creating a new energy economy
sacred site protection
environmental justice
promoting leadership amongst Native youth in Native communities
renewable energy
buffalo restoration
nuclear waste policy
Impacted Nations, a travelling art show of over 50 works from over 40 Indigenous artists
getting out the Native vote
encouraging tribal commitment to the Kyoto protocol

Notable supporters
Musicians who have held benefit concerts for the organization include Bonnie Raitt, Jackson Browne, and David Crosby.

See also 

Climate change
Sustainability

Notes

External links
Honor The Earth
Indigenous Environmental Leader Tom Goldtooth Blocked from U.N. Climate Talks - video report by Democracy Now!

Native American organizations
Climate change organizations based in the United States
Environmental organizations based in the United States
Environmental justice organizations
Environment of Minnesota
Non-profit organizations based in Minnesota
Organizations based in Minneapolis
Indigo Girls
Organizations established in 1993
1993 establishments in Minnesota